is a Japanese manga series by Rin Mikimoto. Kiss Me at the Stroke of Midnight was serialized in the monthly  manga magazine Bessatsu Friend from April 13, 2015 to May 13, 2020. A live-action film adaptation of the same name was released on December 6, 2019.

Plot

Hinana Hanazawa, a diligent and hard-working honors student, secretly yearns for a fairytale-like romance. One day, popular actor Kaede Ayase comes to film a movie at her high school, in which she is appearing as an extra. Hinana discovers that Kaede's true personality is different from his princely image, but in spite of this, they both fall in love with each other. However, difficulties arise in their relationship due to their different social statuses.

Characters

; portrayed by: Kanna Hashimoto (film)

; portrayed by: Ryota Katayose (film)

Portrayed by: Gordon Maeda (film)

Portrayed by: Alissa Yagi (film)

Media

Manga

Kiss Me at the Stroke of Midnight is written and illustrated by Rin Mikimoto. It was serialized in the monthly magazine Bessatsu Friend from the May 2015 issue released on April 13, 2015 to the June 2020 issue released on May 13, 2020. The chapters were later released in 12 bound volumes by Kodansha under the Kodansha Comics Bessatsu Friend imprint.

At New York Comic-Con 2016, Kodansha USA announced that they were publishing the series in English for North American distribution.

Novels

A novel adaptation written by Yui Tokiumi and published by Kodansha under the Kodansha KK Bunko imprint, with illustrations provided by Mikimoto.

Film

In April 2019, the May 2019 issue of Bessatsu Friend announced that a live-action film adaptation was green-lit, with a release date of December 6, 2019 announced later in the year. The film is directed by Takehiko Shinjō and written by Haruka Ōkita, with a starring cast of Generations from Exile Tribe member Ryota Katayose as Kaede and Kanna Hashimoto as Hinana. Additional cast members include Gordon Maeda, Alissa Yagi, Kenichi Endo, Sae Okazaki, Katsuhiro Suzuki, and Wakana Sakai. The film's theme song is "One in a Million (Kiseki no Yoru ni)" performed by Generations from Exile Tribe. A tie-in commercial for Coca-Cola starring Katayose and Ayaka Wilson was produced for and featured in the film.

Reception

Rebecca Silverman from Anime News Network complimented the artwork and the juxtaposition of the Cinderella fairytale but cited issues with some of the romance tropes used.

Kiss Me at the Stroke of Midnight was nominated for Best Shōjo Manga at the 43rd Annual Kodansha Manga Awards.

References

External links
 Official movie website 
 

Live-action films based on manga
Manga adapted into films
Shōjo manga
Kodansha manga
Japanese romantic drama films